Song of the Sea is a poem that appears in the Book of Exodus.

Song of the Sea can also refer to:
 Song of the Sea (1952 film), a 1952 Brazilian film
 Songs of the Sea (1970 film), a 1970 Romanian film
 Song of the Sea (2014 film), a 2014 Irish animated film

See also 
 Songs of the Sea, a multimedia show located at Siloso Beach on Sentosa Island, Singapore
 Songs of the Sea (Stanford), a classical song cycle by Charles Villiers Stanford, premiered in 1904